Tillandsia achyrostachys, Morren and Baker, 1889.

Name: straw-eared, refers to the wrinkled cover leaves.

Shape: stemless, 40 cm high with a flower stalk, the leaves forming an erect rosette.

Leaf bases: oblong-ovate, 2-3 cm wide, 4-6 cm long, gray scaly.

Leaves: erect, slightly curved at the top, narrow lanceolate, 20 cm long and 2 cm wide, above the base.

Flower stalk: upright bare 15 cm long, 3 to 5  mm wide.

Inflorescence: simple ear, flattened on both sides, 15 to 20 cm long and 2 cm wide.

Cover leaves: densely potted, oval, pointed, 4 cm long, 2 cm wide, membranous, ashy, red or greenish red.

Flowers: upright, indoors, 4-6 cm long, green.

Cup leaves: lanceolate, long, pointed.

Petals: form a narrow tube, 4 cm long.

Anthers: protruding from the flower.

Distribution: Mexico, up to 2000 m.

Treatment: moderate water but not too dry, light shade.

Other: reminiscent of a small T. califann in a flowering state.

Cultivars
 Tillandsia 'Key Lime Sundae'
 Tillandsia 'Pink Chiffon'

References

BSI Cultivar Registry Retrieved 11 October 2009

achyrostachys
Endemic flora of Mexico